The 2015 Judo Grand Prix Budapest was held at the László Papp Budapest Sports Arena in Budapest, Hungary from 13 to 14 June 2015.

Medal summary

Men's events

Women's events

Source Results

Medal table

References

External links
 

2015 IJF World Tour
2015 Judo Grand Prix
Judo
Grand Prix 2015
Judo
Judo